Public institution Mixed secondary school builder surveying in Tuzla, educates and produces cadres architecture, construction and geodesy of 1960 when it was founded. A large number of students continued their education at higher education institutions in the country and abroad and has achieved significant success.

Educational institutions established in 1960

Education in Tuzla
Schools in Bosnia and Herzegovina